St John’s Cemetery, Margate is a cemetery located in Margate, Kent in England. The cemetery dates back to 1856

History 

The Surf Boat Memorial is a Grade II listed building in Margate Cemetery.

Notable burials
 Pamela Barton, English amateur golfer
 Samuel Courtauld, art collector
 Thomas Selby Egan, coxswain and rowing coach
 Leslie Fuller, comic actor
 Richard Henry Horne, poet
 Sir William Quiller Orchardson, Scottish portraitist - memorial
 John Sanger, English circus proprietor

War graves
The cemetery contains the war graves of 53 Commonwealth service personnel (two unidentified) of World War I which are scattered throughout the cemetery, and of 83 (three unidentified) from World War Two, in addition to 18 German airmen (one unidentified) who are buried with 50 of the British casualties in a war graves plot in Section 50. A number of dead from the latter war were from the Dunkirk evacuations.

References

External links
Margate Cemetery - Billion Graves


1856 establishments in England
Cemeteries in Kent
Commonwealth War Graves Commission cemeteries in England